Rao Bahadur Sir Vangal Thiruvenkatachari Krishnamachari KCSI, KCIE (8 February 1881 – 14 February 1964) was an Indian civil servant and administrator. He served as the Diwan of Baroda from 1927 to 1944, Prime Minister of Jaipur State from 1946 to 1949 and as a member of the Rajya Sabha from 1961 to 1964.

Early life 

Krishnamachari was born in the village of Vangal in the then Salem District on 8 February 1881. He was the fourth and youngest son of Vangal Thiruvenkatachari (1837–1934) a rich and powerful landlord.

Krishnamachari had his early education in Vangal and graduated from the Presidency College, Madras and Madras Law College. On completion of his education, Krishnamachari qualified for the Indian civil service.

Indian Civil Service 

Krishnamachari served the Additional Secretary of the Madras Board of Revenue from 1913 to 1919 and was the trustee to the Vizianagaram estate from 1919 to 1922.

Diwan of Baroda 

Krishnamachari was appointed Diwan of Baroda in 1927 and he served from 1927 to 1944. Krishnamachari has been one of the longest serving Diwans of Baroda. While serving as Diwan, Krishnamachari also served in the Committee of Ministers, Chamber of Indian Princes from 1941 to 1944.

While serving as Diwan of Baroda, Krishnamachari launched a massive rural reconstruction programme in the princely state.

Prime Minister of Jaipur 

Krishnamachari served as Prime Minister of Jaipur State from 1946 to 1949. he served in the Indian Finances Enquiry Committee from 1948 to 1949 and in Indian Fiscal Commission in 1949.

He was a delegate to all the three Round Table Conferences and was a delegate to the assembly of League of Nations during the years 1934 to 1936.

He was staunch in his support for the major Indian Princely states to join the Indian Union.

After Jaipur acceded to the Indian Union, Krishnamachari joined the Constituent Assembly on 28 April 1947 as a representative of Jaipur. In July 1947, following the decision to partition India, the Constituent Assembly modified its rules to have two Vice-Presidents, and there was a suggestion that one of them might be from the princely states. When the Assembly did elect these Vice-Presidents on 16 July, there were only two nominations, so Krishnamachari (Jaipur) was selected unopposed, along with Dr. Harendra Coomar Mookerjee (West Bengal).

Family 

Krishnamachari married Rangammal on 26 April 1895. The couple had three sons and two daughters, one of whom was V. K. Thiruvenkatachari (1904–1984).

Honours 

Krishnamachari was made a Knight Bachelor in 1933. In 1926, he was invested as a Companion of the Order of the Indian Empire (CIE) and in 1936, a Knight Commander of the Order of the Indian Empire (KCIE). In 1946, he was invested as a Knight Commander of the Order of the Star of India (KCSI).

Works

Notes

References 
 

1881 births
1964 deaths
Administrators in the princely states of India
Indian civil servants
Diwans of Baroda
Members of the Constituent Assembly of India
Indian Knights Bachelor
Knights Commander of the Order of the Indian Empire
Knights Commander of the Order of the Star of India
Indian knights
Presidency College, Chennai alumni
Nominated members of the Rajya Sabha
Rai Bahadurs